Josiah Snelgrove (born July 28, 1986) is a Canadian soccer player who most recently played for FC Buffalo.

Early life
Snelgrove was born in Hartland, New Brunswick.

Career

Youth and college
He attended Houghton College, where he scored two goals and contributed 13 assists in his four years with Houghton, earning all-conference honors three times, and receiving a 2007 NAIA Men's Soccer All-America Teams honorable mention.

During his college years he also played for Ottawa Fury and the Southern California Seahorses in the USL Premier Development League.

Professional
Snelgrove turned professional in 2007 when he signed for USL Second Division side Charlotte Eagles. He made his professional debut on June 28, 2008 in a game against the Bermuda Hogges.

After spending the 2009 back with the Southern California Seahorses in the USL Premier Development League, Snelgrove returned to the Eagles for the 2010 USL Second Division campaign, but did not feature in any games due to persistent injury.

Snelgrove signed with F.C. New York of the USL Pro league on March 15, 2011.

References

External links
Charlotte Eagles bio

Canadian soccer players
Charlotte Eagles players
Ottawa Fury (2005–2013) players
Southern California Seahorses players
F.C. New York players
USL Second Division players
USL League Two players
USL Championship players
Sportspeople from New Brunswick
1986 births
Living people
People from Carleton County, New Brunswick
Houghton University alumni
Association football defenders
FC Buffalo players